The Roman Catholic Diocese of Zhaoxian is a diocese located in Zhao County in the Ecclesiastical province of Beijing in China.

History
 March 18, 1929: Established as Apostolic Prefecture of Zhaoxian 趙縣 from the Apostolic Vicariate of Zhengdingfu 正定府
 January 11, 1932: Promoted as Apostolic Vicariate of Zhaoxian 趙縣
 April 11, 1946: Promoted as Diocese of Zhaoxian 趙縣

Leadership
 Bishops of Zhaoxian 趙縣 (Roman rite)
 Bishop John Zhang Bi-de (April 11, 1946 – February 13, 1953)
 Vicars Apostolic of Zhaoxian 趙縣 (Roman Rite)
 Bishop John Zhang Bi-de (January 11, 1932 – April 11, 1946)
 Prefects Apostolic of Zhaoxian 趙縣 (Roman Rite)
 Fr. John Zhang Bi-de (later Bishop) (April 9, 1929 – January 11, 1932)

References

 GCatholic.org
 Catholic Hierarchy

Roman Catholic dioceses in China
Christian organizations established in 1929
Roman Catholic dioceses and prelatures established in the 20th century
Christianity in Hebei
1929 establishments in China